Jungar Banner (Mongolian:  , Зүүнгар хошуу Jegünɣar qosiɣu) is a banner of western Inner Mongolia, People's Republic of China, lying on the western (right) bank of the Yellow River and bordering the provinces of Shanxi to the southeast and Shaanxi to the southwest. It is under the administration of Ordos City.

Climate

References

External links
Official site 

Banners of Inner Mongolia
Ordos City